Laako is a town located in the eastern Sanaag region of Somaliland. The city lies between Badhan and El Ayo.

See also
Sanaag

References
Laako

Populated places in Sanaag
Cities in Maakhir
Geography of Somalia
Archaeological sites in Somalia